James Thomas Breech (born April 11, 1956) is a former American football placekicker in the National Football League (NFL), who played for Oakland Raiders in 1979 and Cincinnati Bengals from 1980-1992.  Before his NFL career, Breech played for the University of California, Berkeley and Sacramento High School. Breech was notable among kickers for wearing a different size cleat on his kicking foot. He wore a smaller size 5 cleat on his right kicking foot (his normal size was 7) which he felt gave him more control and stability kicking the football.

Early career
Breech was the starting kicker for Cal in 1977 and 1978, making 58/59 extra points and 32/51 field goals (62%) in his two seasons.  Breech was selected in the 8th round of the 1978 NFL Draft by the Detroit Lions but was cut by the team before the start of the season. He spent the 1979 season with the Raiders, but they cut him in the 1980 pre-season in order to sign kicker Chris Bahr, who had just been cut by the Bengals. Breech was later asked by Cleveland Browns personnel director Paul Warfield to possibly join the team as a replacement for injured Don Cockroft. However, not hearing back from Cleveland, he received a phone call from the Bengals' assistant personnel director Frank Smouse. Breech was signed by the Bengals, and ended up staying there for the remainder of his career.

NFL career
In his 14 NFL seasons, Breech made 243 of 340 field goals (71.4%), 517 of 539 extra points (95.9%), and scored 1,246 total points. His 1,151 points with the Bengals are a franchise record. He is second all-time scoring in consecutive games with 186 consecutive games, and he was a perfect 9 for 9 in overtime field goals, an NFL record.  Breech played in 9 postseason games during his career.  In all of them combined, he missed just 2 field goals out of 11 attempts and never missed an extra point. Breech also played in Super Bowl XVI and Super Bowl XXIII, was perfect in both games, not missing a field goal or extra point in either one. In Super Bowl XXIII, he kicked 3 field goals and scored 10 of Cincinnati's 16 points in the game. When his third field goal gave the Bengals a 16-13 lead over the San Francisco 49ers with just 3:10 left in the game, it appeared there was a strong possibility he would become the first kicker ever to win the Super Bowl MVP award. However, the 49ers ended that chance by driving 92 yards and scoring the winning touchdown with 34 seconds left in the game.
In 1999, he was inducted into the University of California Athletic hall of fame.

Career regular season statistics
Career high/best bolded

After football
Breech is a sales executive for the Hauser Group, an insurance firm in the Cincinnati suburb of Blue Ash, Ohio. He also heads the Cincinnati chapter of NFL Alumni and is also on the board of directors for Kicks for Kids, an organization to help needy kids started by fellow former Cincinnati Bengals kicker Doug Pelfrey.

References

1956 births
Living people
Players of American football from Sacramento, California
American football placekickers
California Golden Bears football players
Cincinnati Bengals players
Oakland Raiders players